The Country Bankers Act 1826 was an Act of the Parliament of the United Kingdom enacted during the reign of George IV. The Act restricted the issue of banknotes by commercial banks in England and Wales.

This Act also allowed the Bank of England to open branches in major provincial cities, enabling better distribution for its notes.

The Country Bankers Act 1826 was one of the Bank Notes Acts 1826 to 1852.

References

Notes

United Kingdom Acts of Parliament 1826
1826 in economics
Banking legislation in the United Kingdom